David Edward Pritchard (born October 15, 1941 in New York City) is physics professor at the Massachusetts Institute of Technology (MIT).  Professor Pritchard carried out pioneering experiments on the interaction of atoms with light that led to the creation of the field of atom optics. His demonstration of the diffraction of a beam of atoms by a grating made of light waves opened the way to studies of the diffraction, reflection, and focusing of matter waves, similar to those with light waves. He has applied atom optics to basic studies of quantum theory, to new methods for studying the properties of atoms, and to the creation of devices such as the atom interferometer and atom wave gyroscope.

In 1990, he brought Wolfgang Ketterle to MIT as a postdoctoral researcher to work on atom cooling, and stepped aside from that field to allow Ketterle to be appointed to the faculty in 1992. Ketterle pursued atom cooling to achieve Bose–Einstein condensation in 1995, a discovery for which Ketterle was awarded the Nobel Prize in Physics in 2001, along with Eric Cornell and Carl Wieman of JILA, Boulder, Colorado. Professor Pritchard also mentored Eric Cornell, who was his graduate student.

Notes

External links
David Pritchard appointed as Director of Research Laboratory of Electronics at MIT
MIT'S Wolfgang Ketterle: New Marching Orders for Atoms

1941 births
Living people
California Institute of Technology alumni
Harvard University alumni
Massachusetts Institute of Technology School of Science faculty
21st-century American physicists
Members of the United States National Academy of Sciences
Fellows of the American Physical Society